Bruce Silas Beer (August 19, 1910 in Bethany, Ontario, Canada – January 12, 1998) was a Canadian politician and farmer. He was elected to the House of Commons of Canada in the 1962 as a Member of the Liberal Party to represent the riding of Peel. He was re-elected in 1963, 1965 and for the riding of Peel—Dufferin—Simcoe in 1968. During his federal political career, he was Parliamentary Secretary to the Minister of Agriculture and Parliamentary Secretary to the Minister of Forestry. He was also a Member of the Commons Standing Committee on Agriculture.

External links
 Brampton West Federal Liberal Riding Association: A Lifetime of Good Memories Tracking Politics
 

1910 births
1998 deaths
Liberal Party of Canada MPs
Members of the House of Commons of Canada from Ontario